The Little Couple is an American reality television series on TLC that debuted May 26, 2009. The series features Bill Klein, a businessman, and Dr. Jennifer Arnold a neonatologist, who both have skeletal dysplasia. Arnold is 96.5 cm (3'2") and Klein 122 cm (4 feet) tall. They moved from New York City, after Jen completed her pediatric residency and masters of medical education at University of Pittsburgh Medical Center.

Production
The show begins with the couple having just moved to Houston, Texas, where the series has documented the customized building of their home and attempts to have a child. Arnold is a neonatologist who works at the Texas Children's Hospital, and Klein is a medical supplies and telemarketing businessman.

They were originally introduced in a one-hour TLC special, Little People: Just Married. Season 1 of the show premiered on May 26, 2009. Season 2 premiered on October 27, 2009. On February 22, 2010, TLC renewed The Little Couple for a third season consisting of 20 episodes. The mid-season finale aired after 9 episodes on July 27, 2010, and season 3 returned on October 12, 2010. It was announced on Facebook that the show would be returning for its 4th season on May 31, 2011. Again, the season was split, with the second half of season 4 premiering on September 27, 2011.

In February 2012, Klein opened Rocky&Maggie in Rice Village Houston. named after their pets Chihuahua Rocky and rescue mutt terrier Maggie. Arnold's mother Judy manages the store. Season 5 began on March 20, 2012, and follows Klein and Arnold as they move into their custom-built dream home and launch a brand-new business. In March 2013, they adopted their son, Will, from Hohhot, China. The adoption of their son, who also has dwarfism, is featured in Season 5. On October 15, 2013, they adopted a daughter, Zoey, also a little person, from Delhi, India. The series went into an hiatus on June 4, 2013, and returned on August 13, 2013.

In December 2013, Arnold revealed that she was diagnosed with a rare form of cancer, stage 4 choriocarcinoma, due to a non-viable pregnancy she had suffered in September 2013. She allowed the cameras to document her struggle.

Season 6 premiered on March 4, 2014. It features Zoey's adoption, Arnold's cancer treatment, Will's fourth birthday, baptisms, the holiday season, and Arnold's 40th birthday.

The twelfth season premiered on August 6, 2019.

Television appearances

 The Oprah Winfrey Show (March 9, 2009)
 The Today Show (July 7, 2009)
 The Dr. Oz Show (October 1, 2009)
 Good Day L.A. (December 16, 2009)
 The Wendy Williams Show (May 25, 2010)
 ABC News (May 25, 2010)
 KHOU Great Day Houston (multiple appearances)
 The Doctors (2008 TV series) (October 6, 2010)
 ABC 13 (November 18, 2010)
 Good Day L.A. (August 2, 2011)
 Extreme Makeover: Home Edition (October 16, 2011)
 Fox News (March 19, 2012)
 Anderson (March 20, 2012)
 Tamron Hall (July 20, 2020)

Episodes

Series overview

Season 1 (2009)

Season 2 (2009–10)

Season 3 (2010)

Season 4 (2011)

Season 5 (2012)

Season 6 (2013)

Season 7 (2014)

Season 8 (2014–15)

Season 9 (2016)

Season 10 (2017)

Season 11 (2018)

Season 12 (2019)

References

2000s American reality television series
2010s American reality television series
2009 American television series debuts
English-language television shows
Television shows set in Texas
TLC (TV network) original programming
Works about dwarfism